Leif Printzlau (born 16 December 1948) is a Danish former footballer who played as a left midfielder. He competed with the Denmark national team in the men's tournament at the 1972 Summer Olympics.

References

External links
 
 

1948 births
Living people
People from Nyborg
Danish men's footballers
Association football midfielders
Denmark international footballers
Denmark youth international footballers
Denmark under-21 international footballers
Olympic footballers of Denmark
Footballers at the 1972 Summer Olympics
Boldklubben Frem players
Sportspeople from the Region of Southern Denmark